Hammarsland is a village in Øygarden municipality in Vestland county, Norway. The village is located on the island of Sotra, just east of the village of Skogsvåg.

References

Villages in Vestland
Øygarden